Lyès Bouyacoub (born 3 April 1983) is an Algerian judoka who won the African Championships in 2014 and 2015, placing second in 2013 and 2016. He competed at the 2016 Olympics, but was eliminated in the third round.

References

External links

 
 
 

1983 births
Living people
Algerian male judoka
Olympic judoka of Algeria
Judoka at the 2016 Summer Olympics
African Games gold medalists for Algeria
African Games medalists in judo
Mediterranean Games bronze medalists for Algeria
Mediterranean Games medalists in judo
Competitors at the 2011 All-Africa Games
Competitors at the 2015 African Games
Competitors at the 2018 Mediterranean Games
21st-century Algerian people
20th-century Algerian people